Evelyn B. Pantig is a Filipino civil servant and former chairwoman of the National Commission for Culture and the Arts and undersecretary for tourism of the Philippines under Corazon Aquino and Gloria Macapagal Arroyo administrations.

Biography 
She was the vice chair and later chair of the National Commission for Culture and the Arts from  2003 to 2005. She was appointed the officer-in-charge of the Department of Tourism in 1996 and in 2004. 

Pantig graduated of bachelor of science in Chemical Engineering from Mapua Institute of Technology. She was scholar in tourism planning in developing economies at the University of Bradford. She got her masters in Business Administration from De La Salle University and later her doctorate degree from the Philippine Women’s University.

References

Filipino civil servants